is a Japanese television drama series which first aired on Tokai TV in 2010.

Cast

First season
Alice Hirose
Mayo Kawasaki
Sachi Funaki
Yūya Shimizu
Ikkei Watanabe
Shin Yazawa
Ryōga Hayashi
Tetsuji Sakakibara
Naruki Matsukawa
Erika Tonooka
Reo Yoshitake

Second season
Fujiko Kojima
Naoyuki Morita
Yua Shinkawa
Mami Nishino
Aiki Nishida
Ibuki Shimizu
Natsumi Ogawa
Ren Mori
Yuya Matsushita
Honoka Miki
Yasuhiro Arai
Natsumi Nanase
Yuria Kizaki
Haruka Mano
Reika Yamada

References

External links
  
  
 

2010 Japanese television series debuts
2011 Japanese television series endings
Japanese drama television series